The Goa Chess Association (GSCA) is an association for the game of chess in Goa, India. It was formed in 1977 and is affiliated with the All India Chess Federation.

History
In 1973 the All Goa Daman & Diu Chess Association was formed under the presidency of P. K. Dias, however, it became defunct. Then in 1977 a group of enthusiasts banding themselves together as Vasco Chess Association approached the State Council and revived the State Body with the presidency of Dr. R. V. Deo.

Affiliates
Bambolim Chess Club   
Mapusa Chess Club 
Cortalim Chess Club 
Jai Chess Club 
Margao Chess Club 
Porvorim Chess Club 
Curchorem Chess Club 
Vithalapur Chess Club
Clube Desporto
Panjim Gymkhana 
Super Sports Club

Academy
Kingshekhar Chess Academy

Events
Since its inception the GSCA has been regularly holding tournaments in all Categories of events announced by the All India Chess Federation and have been sending teams to the Nationals. It has also hosted 5 National Level Tournaments. Some of them are:
National Sub - Junior (1983)
 National Junior (1984)
 A. N. Naik Memorial FIDE rated Open Chess Tournament (2000 & 2002)
 World Junior Chess Championship (2004)
Hirabai Salgaoncar FIDE Rating (2006)
GVM FIDE Rating 2011
National Juniors 2011

References
Official Website of GSCA
Goa Clubs & Coaches

Chess organizations
Chess in India
1977 establishments in Goa, Daman and Diu
Sport in Goa
Sports organizations established in 1977